The Maltese Women's League or for sponsorship reasons BOV Women's League is the top-level league of women's football in Malta. It is run by the Malta Football Association.

After several failed attempts in the 1970s and 1980s to create a lasting women's football competition, successful tournaments of San Gwann and Luxol St. Andrews gained so much interest, that the Malta Football Association decided to organize the first ever league in 1995–96.

The most titles were won by Hibernians.

Although the winning team of the league qualifies for a spot in the UEFA Women's Champions League, the spot is not always taken. Malta currently sits at the last spot in the UEFA coefficients women's ranking and the last club to take part was Birkirkara in 2007–08; Birkirkana lost all three games with 1–37 goals. In 09–10 they competed again and ended up with three losses and 1-26 goals.

2022–23 teams 

The 2022–23 season was played by the following teams.

Format
Until the 2011–12 season there were eight teams in the league. The teams played each other twice for a total of 14 matches each. After that the champion qualifies to the UEFA Champion's League and the last two places are relegated to the Maltese Seceond Division. Since then the format has changed a lot.

In the 2012–13, after the regular season the top four played a championship group and the bottom placed four teams played the relegation round. Points of the regular season and the second stage were added. In 2013–14 there was just one stage, where seven teams played each other three times. Also there was a title decider match after the top two teams were tied on points. Hibernians won the title over Birkirkara in a penalty shootout.

In 2014–15 there were eleven teams, and again a championship group to which the top six after the regular season qualified.

For 2015–16 the league was reduced to six teams. They play each other four times for a total of 20 matches per team.

List of champions 
The season winners are:

1995/96: Rabat Ajax 
1996/97: Lija Athletic 
1997/98: Rabat Ajax
1998/99: Hibernians 
1999/2000: Hibernians
2000/01: Hibernians
2001/02: Hibernians
2002/03: Hibernians
2003/04: Hibernians
2004/05: Hibernians
2005/06: Hibernians
2006/07: Birkirkara
2007/08: Hibernians
2008/09: Birkirkara
2009/10: Birkirkara
2010/11: Mosta
2011/12: Birkirkara
2012/13: Birkirkara
2013/14: Hibernians 
2014/15: Hibernians
2015/16: Hibernians
2016/17: Birkirkara
2017/18: Birkirkara
2018/19: Birkirkara
2019/20: Birkirkara
2020/21: not awarded
2021/22: Birkirkara

Record Champions

References

External links
 sportsdesk.com.mt
 League at UEFA
 League at women.soccerway.com

Top level women's association football leagues in Europe
1
Women
Women's sports leagues in Malta